The Moroccan Super Cup  was a one-match football tournament that was held at the end of each season between the Moroccan League champion and the Moroccan Throne Cup champion.

History 
This cup was initially called the Federal Cup and then later bore the name of the Youth Cup, and it was supervised by the Royal Moroccan Football Federation. The first edition of this cup was played in the 1958-1959 season, and it was played for four consecutive seasons, then it stopped 10 years for unknown reasons, to return again in the 1975-1974 season, and this season’s match was delayed to March of the year 1976 to be held in the city of Laayoune on the occasion of the Green March, which noticed SCC Mohammédia winning the last edition of this cup.

Results of the finals

Performance by club

References

External links
RSSSF competition history

Football competitions in Morocco
Morocco
Recurring sporting events established in 1959
1959 establishments in Morocco